Duplicaria  may refer to:
 Duplicaria (gastropod), a genus of snails in the family Terebridae 
 Duplicaria (fungus), a genus of fungi in the family Rhytismataceae